Noora is a female given name in Finnish and Arabic, which is derived from the Biblical name of Nora. In Arabic, it means “light” and its male equivalent is Noor.

Notable people with the Finnish given name:
 Noora Hautakangas (born 1984), Finnish model
 Piia-Noora Kauppi (born 1975), Finnish director
 Noora Laukkanen (born 1993), Finnish swimmer
 Noora Louhimo (born 1988), Finnish singer
 Noora Räty (born 1989), Finnish ice hockey goaltender
 Noora Ruskola (born 1994), Finnish sailor
 Noora Tamminen (born 1990), Finnish golfer
 Noora Tulus (born 1995), Finnish ice hockey player

Notable people with the Arabic given name:
 Noora Naraghi (born 1988), Iranian motocross racer
 Noora Salem Jasim (born 1996), Bahraini athlete

Nickname:
 Noora Noor (born 1979), Somalian-Norwegian singer

See also
 Noura
 All pages beginning with "Noora"
 All pages with a title containing Noora